Whetstone International Airport or Del Bonita/Whetstone International Airport  is a public use airport at the Canada–US border, in Port of Del Bonita, Glacier County, Montana,  south of Del Bonita, Cardston County, Alberta. The airport is owned by the U.S. state of Montana and is operated by the Montana Department of Transportation Aeronautics Division.

The airport has a runway located on the border, with aircraft tie down areas in Canada and in the United States. It is classified as an airport of entry by Nav Canada and is staffed by the Canada Border Services Agency (CBSA). CBSA officers at this airport can handle general aviation aircraft only, with no more than 15 passengers.

The airport is one of six airports that straddle the Canada–US border. The others are Avey Field State Airport, Coutts/Ross International Airport, International Peace Garden Airport, Piney Pinecreek Border Airport, and Coronach/Scobey Border Station Airport.

Facilities and aircraft 

For the 12-month period ending April 27, 2016, the airport had 110 aircraft operations: 73% general aviation and 27% military.

See also 
 List of airports in Montana
 List of airports in Alberta

References

External links 
 Page about this airport on COPA's Places to Fly airport directory
 Aerial image as of August 1995 from USGS The National Map
 

Airports in Montana
Registered aerodromes in Alberta
Transportation in Glacier County, Montana
Buildings and structures in Glacier County, Montana
Buildings and structures in Cardston County
Binational airports